Clay Rush (born October 27, 1973) is a former American football kicker who played in the Arena Football League (AFL) from 1999 to the original league's folding in 2008.

Early years
At Riverview Gardens High School in St. Louis, Missouri, Rush was a three-sport star in football, soccer, and baseball. He threw a no-hitter his senior season against Normandy High School. He also played basketball early in his high school career though he didn't play varsity.

Rush attended Missouri Western State University, where he was named to the Mid–America Intercollegiate Athletics Association All-Conference Team four times, and was an NCAA Division II All-American as a senior.

Professional career
Rush attended NFL training camp with the Detroit Lions (1998), Atlanta Falcons (1999), Washington Redskins (2000), and New York Jets (2003).

Rush played for the Shreveport Knights in the short-lived Regional Football League in 1999.

Arena Football League
Rush was named First Team All-Arena in 2000 and 2003. He was also named Second Team All-Arena in 2005 and 2006. Rush was named AFL Kicker of the Year in both 2000 and 2003.  In 2001, Rush made an AFL-record 110 extra-points, including a record 13 made PATs vs. Carolina on July 7, 2001. Rush made the game-winning field goal as time expired during ArenaBowl XIX. In 2005, Rush converted a 62-yard field goal and lead the AFL in touchbacks.

In 2008, Rush sustained a series of hits to the head in two games two weeks apart. Rush was removed from the game in Kansas City following positive signs of concussion.  Following the second concussion, Rush wasn't properly evaluated or monitored.  Team physicians cleared Rush to return to play after resting for a week.  When Rush played again on about April 25, 2008, his symptoms worsened and he suffered permanent brain damage.

References

Further reading
 http://www.oursportscentral.com/services/releases/clay-rush-signs-with-new-york-jets/n-1996644
 https://www.nytimes.com/1998/07/24/sports/transactions-052418.html
 http://www.oursportscentral.com/services/releases/crush-sign-two-time-kicker-of-the-year-clay-rush/n-3089743
 http://www.denverpost.com/2005/06/20/crushs-hero-may-fit-titans-to-a-tee/
 http://a.espncdn.com/nfl/news/2003/0604/1563080.html

External links

 Clay Rush at ArenaFan Online

1973 births
Living people
People from St. Louis County, Missouri
Players of American football from Missouri
American football placekickers
Missouri Western Griffons football players
Iowa Barnstormers players
New York Dragons players
Indiana Firebirds players
Colorado Crush players
Arizona Rattlers players
Kansas City Brigade players
Regional Football League players